Desert Fox is a 1985 video game developed by Sydney Development Corporation and published by Accolade and U.S. Gold(in Europe). It was subsequently re-released by Avantage and PowerHouse.

Reception
1991 and 1993 Computer Gaming World surveys of strategy and war games gave it one star out of five, stating that "it attempted to mix both arcade play and simulation, and ultimately failed on both levels".

In contrast, Zzap!64 thought the game was "an excellent blend of strategy and arcade action" and gave it an overall rating of 87%.

References

1985 video games
Accolade (company) games
Action video games
Amstrad CPC games
Commodore 64 games
Cancelled ZX Spectrum games
Cultural depictions of Erwin Rommel
Strategy video games
Tank simulation video games
U.S. Gold games
Video games about Nazi Germany
Video games developed in the United States
Video games set in Libya
World War II video games
Single-player video games
Sydney Development Corporation games